The Hrvatska Premijer ženska košarkaška liga, also known as Premijer ženska liga or simply Premijer liga, is the first tier level league for women's basketball clubs in Croatia. Founded in 1991 following the independence of the country, it is contested by ten teams.

Currently the champion is granted a spot in the EuroLeague Women.

History

Current season teams (2018–2019)

Champions

List of champions

 ''Including titles in SFR Yugoslavia and Croatia

References

External links
Profile at eurobasket.com

 
Croatia
women
    
basketball
Sports leagues established in 1991
1991 establishments in Croatia
Professional sports leagues in Croatia